Sound Document is an independent record label based in Vancouver, British Columbia, Canada.  The music label signs only Canadian bands with the label's current genre focus of dance-punk/indie rock.  It was founded in 2004 by Dani Vachon and Doug Phillips. In 2006 the label became a sole proprietorship of Dani Vachon.

Artists include  You Say Party! We Say Die!, Bakelite, Cadeaux and Hot Loins.

See also

 List of record labels

References

Record labels established in 2004
Canadian independent record labels
Indie rock record labels
Companies based in Vancouver